Domnell Crone Ó Flaithbheartaigh (died 1560) was a Lord  of Iar Connacht, Ireland, and Chief of the Name.

References

 West or H-Iar Connaught Ruaidhrí Ó Flaithbheartaigh, 1684 (published 1846, ed. James Hardiman).
 Origin of the Surname O'Flaherty, Anthony Matthews, Dublin, 1968, p. 40.
 CELT: Corpus of Electronic Texts at University College Cork

People from County Galway
1560 deaths
Domnell
Year of birth unknown
Irish lords